Matthew J. Holman (born 1967) is a Smithsonian astrophysicist and lecturer at Harvard University. Holman studied at MIT, where he received his bachelor's degree in mathematics in 1989 and his PhD in planetary science in 1994. He was awarded the Newcomb Cleveland Prize in 1998.

From 25 January 2015 to 9 February 2021, he held the position of an interim director of IAU's Minor Planet Center (MPC), after former director Timothy B. Spahr had stepped down. Holman was followed by Matthew Payne as new director of the MPC.

He was a Salina Central High School (Kansas) classmate and fellow debate team member of Joe Miller, Alaskan Senate candidate. The main-belt asteroid 3666 Holman was named in his honour in 1999.

Discoveries 

He was also part of a team that discovered numerous irregular moons:
 Discovered moons of Neptune (full list):
 Halimede  – in 2002 with J.J. Kavelaars, T. Grav, W. Fraser and D. Milisavljevic 
 Sao  – in 2002 with J.J. Kavelaars, T. Grav, W. Fraser, D. Milisavljevic 
 Laomedeia  – in 2002, with J.J. Kavelaars, T. Grav, W. Fraser, D. Milisavljevic 
 Neso  – in 2002, with B. Gladman et al. 
  Discovered moons of Uranus (full list):
 Prospero  – in 1999, with J.J. Kavelaars, B. Gladman, J.-M. Petit, H. Scholl 
 Setebos  – in 1999, with J.J. Kavelaars, B. Gladman, J.-M. Petit, H. Scholl 
 Stephano  – in 1999, with B. Gladman, J.J. Kavelaars, J.-M. Petit, H. Scholl 
 Trinculo  – in 2001, with J.J. Kavelaars, D. Milisavljevic 
 Francisco  – in 2001, with J.J. Kavelaars, D. Milisavljevic, T. Grav 
 Ferdinand  – in 2001, with D. Milisavljevic, J.J. Kavelaars, T. Grav 
 Discovered moons of Saturn (full list):
 Albiorix  – in 2000, with T.B. Spahr

See also 
 List of minor planet discoverers

References

External links 
 Matthew J. Holman, homepage at Center for Astrophysics  Harvard & Smithsonian
 The Minor Planet Center Status Report Matthew Holman, 8 November 2015

1967 births
American astronomers
Discoverers of moons
Discoverers of minor planets

Harvard University faculty
Living people
Massachusetts Institute of Technology School of Science alumni
Planetary scientists
Harvard–Smithsonian Center for Astrophysics people